Palimna sumatrana is a species of beetle in the family Cerambycidae. It was described by Breuning in 1938.

References

Ancylonotini
Beetles described in 1938